Marsha Symens is an American politician and former educator representing the 25th district in the South Dakota Senate. Symens took office on January 12, 2021, succeeding Kris Langer. Before entering politics, she worked as a teacher in Phoenix, Arizona; Houston; and Dell Rapids, South Dakota.

References 

Living people
Republican Party South Dakota state senators
Women state legislators in South Dakota
People from Dell Rapids, South Dakota
Year of birth missing (living people)
21st-century American women